Milton Milan (born November 10, 1962) is an American Democratic politician. He was the first Latino Mayor of Camden, New Jersey, elected in 1997, before being convicted of corruption and subsequently removed from office, becoming the third Camden mayor in 20 years to be found guilty of corruption.

Biography
Milan grew up in North Camden and served as a United States Marine in the 1980s. He was elected to City Council in 1995. During his first term as mayor, he was indicted on a 19-count corruption case, and convicted on 14 of those counts on December 21, 2000, among them:
laundered $65,000 in drug money
staged a break-in with his former business partner to collect insurance money illegally
accepted $30,000 to $50,000 in bribes from the Mafia
used campaign money to pay for a vacation to Puerto Rico
received two vehicles and thousands of dollars in free work on his home from city contractors
and authorized the shakedown of a $5,000 political contribution from the city's public defender

The judge sentenced him to the maximum allowed under federal sentencing guidelines: seven years and three months in prison minus time served, and three years of supervision, plus barred from running for office. He spared Milan a fine, citing the lack of ability to pay, but Milan was held responsible for $14,761 in restitution.

References

Living people
1962 births
Hispanic and Latino American mayors in New Jersey
Mayors of Camden, New Jersey
Politicians convicted of racketeering
American money launderers
New Jersey Democrats
New Jersey politicians convicted of corruption
New Jersey politicians convicted of crimes